Scolizona palinoides is a moth in the family Lecithoceridae. It is found in Papua New Guinea.

The forewings are irregularly scattered with dark-brown scales, especially dense in the basal area and below the discal spots, which consist of a pair of large blackish spots before the middle and near the end of the cell. The hindwings are pale grey, with dark-brown scales sparsely scattered in the lower part of the discal cell.

Etymology
The species name is derived from Greek palin (meaning backward) with the suffix -oides.

References

Moths described in 2011
Lecithocerinae